Bogoljub Karić (born 17 January 1954) is a Serbian businessman and politician.

Early life and education
Bogoljub was born to Janićije Karić and Danica Kuzmanović. He earned a degree in Geography at the University of Pristina and his Master's Degree in economy at University of Niš. He married Milanka Babić and has four children Nebojša, Nadežda, Jelena and Danica.

Career

The Karić family have owned manufacturing business in Eastern Europe since the 1960s. The population knows him simply as a mechanic from Kosovo without a degree. He opened a workshop, starting with small operations of under ten employees. From this, Karić grew his business empire into multibillion-dollar corporation, now known as the Astra Group.

The Astra (BK) Group is composed of the following industry sectors:
 manufacturing, civil engineering and constructing
 International wholesales export-import trading
 Telecommunications and electronic media (GSM and NMT mobile telephony, internet services, alphanumeric paging, BK Telecom TV station)
 Banking and finance
 Media which includes television, radio, magazines, newspapers and online
 Science and education Karić is the founder and owner of BK University.
 Charitable activities The BK Foundation funds humanitarian aid in Yugoslavia and other countries. It is focused on helping children, refugees and provides scholarships for disadvantaged and talented students. The activities of the Foundation are also centred on the promotion of cultural values.

In 1987 he established first private construction company in Moscow (ex USSR) which is nowadays one of the largest construction companies in Europe.

In 2002, Karić created the Association of Industrialists and Entrepreneurs of Yugoslavia, the first true association of private businessmen in Yugoslavia set up since World War II.

In 2006 he established another construction company named DANA HOLDINGS. Dana Holdings is a leading, fully integrated real estate, investment and development company of residential, industrial, commercial, educational and mixed-use projects as well as PPP investments in emerging markets. The company has successfully completed construction projects totaling millions of square meters for the Russian government, Moscow City Government, the Government of Yakutia, Kazakhstan, Uzbekistan, Tajikistan, Kyrgyzstan, Ukraine, Belarus, Moldova, Armenia, Azerbaijan, Georgia and other countries of the former Soviet Union.

Education and science work 

He completed primary and high school in Pec, he graduated from the Faculty of Natural Sciences and Mathematics in Pristina, with the major in geography. He obtained his MA diploma from Faculty of Economics in Niš with thesis in Organization and development of medium-sized enterprises.

Karić wrote several research papers published in country and abroad. Many of these lectures are published in various magazines he owned. He is author of many books which focus on private business, finance, and financial management which were written by bachelor and master students at his own universities.

Political and social activities
Karić ran for President of Serbia in the June 2004 Presidential Election, polling nearly 20% of the vote. His message was on the supremacy of economy over politics, the need to fundamentally transform Serbian society into a modern European democracy and revitalise its economy.

Karić subsequently formed and registered his political party Strength of Serbia Movement (SSM) which  participated in the local elections of September 2004. At these elections, the SSM, although formed barely a month before the elections, had a surprisingly good showing, established itself firmly in the center of the democratic bloc of political forces in Serbia. Its representatives, in coalition with other democratic forces were part of many municipal councils (including that of the capital Belgrade), and it had several deputies and ministers in the Provincial Government of the Autonomous Province of Vojvodina.

As a new law on political parties became valid, Strength of Serbia Movement re-registered itself again in 2010 under the name Strength of Serbia Movement - BK. At that moment, SSM was in coalition with Tomislav Nikolić's party, forming an opposition bloc for the next elections.

International Sanctions
On June 3, 2022 he was sanctioned by the EU authorities because he is believed to have close ties with the president of Belarus, Alexander Lukashenko; and his company, Dana Holdings, is said to be the only non-government owned entity that provides the Belarusian regime with economical benefits.

References

External links
Karić Foundation
Bogoljub Karić official Facebook page
Al Jazeera Balkans
N1 News

1954 births
Living people
Politicians from Peja
Kosovo Serbs
Strength of Serbia Movement politicians
20th-century Serbian businesspeople
University of Niš alumni
Recipients of the Order of St. Sava
Candidates for President of Serbia
Businesspeople from Peja